Chen Cuichang (born 27 October 1961), better known by her stage name Xiang Yun, is a Singaporean actress & television host. 
 She is commonly referred to as MediaCorp's first "Ah Jie" (Senior actress) for being among the first locally trained artistes and has been in the entertainment industry for more than 29 years.

Career
Chen is one of the first batch of graduates from SBC's drama training class. She began her career in children's drama in 1980 and proceeded to act in the drama series Double Blessings and All That Glitters Is Not Gold in 1983. It was her role as "Ah Mei", love interest of Huang Wenyong's character "Ah Shui", in the 1984 blockbuster drama series The Awakening that propelled her to fame, evidenced by the fact that she and Huang were named among the "Top 5 Favourite On-Screen Partners" and "Top 5 Most Memorable Drama Characters" of the last 25 years at the Star Awards 2007 anniversary special.

In 1997, she played Singaporean war heroine Elizabeth Choy in the war drama The Price of Peace. After the birth of her second child, she took a brief hiatus from acting. She returned to television in 2000 and has since been cast in major roles in many of MediaCorp's large-scale productions, such as Double Happiness, Portrait of Home, The Little Nyonya and Kinship.

Despite competition from younger actresses, Chen's popularity remained high as she was voted the "Top 10 Most Popular Artistes" in the annual Star Awards from 2000 to 2010 and was awarded the coveted "All-Time Favourite Artiste Award". She has also won the "Best Supporting Actress" award for a record 4 times, in years 1998, 2000, 2001 and 2009.

In 2011, she received the All-Time Favourite Artiste award after winning the Top 10 Most Popular Female Artistes award from 2000-2010 respectively.

Personal life
Chen is married to former MediaCorp actor Edmund Chen. They first met on the set of Patrol and married after a whirlwind romance, which drew much media attention as unpublicised celebrity marriages were uncommon in the local entertainment industry at that time. 
They have a son, Yixi and daughter, Yixin.

Filmography

Awards and nominations

References

External links
 Xiang Yun profile on The Celebrity Agency

1961 births
20th-century Singaporean actresses
21st-century Singaporean actresses
Singaporean television personalities
Singaporean television actresses
Singaporean film actresses
Living people
Singaporean people of Teochew descent